Camp Roberts is a California National Guard post in central California, located on both sides of the Salinas River in Monterey and San Luis Obispo counties, now run by the California Army National Guard. It was opened in 1941 and is named after Corporal Harold W. Roberts, a World War I Medal of Honor recipient. Nearby communities include San Miguel, Heritage Ranch (Lake Nacimiento), Oak Shores (Lake Nacimiento), and Bradley, all unincorporated. The nearest incorporated city is Paso Robles.

Camp Roberts is host to annual training for California Army National Guard units and the British Army.

As of 2014, Camp Roberts is undergoing major renovations, including demolition of World War II-era barracks. Demolition of the World War II-era structures facing US Route 101 began in 2012. To contain the hazardous materials from the demolished barracks, a large hazardous waste landfill was created.

History 

Under the leadership Lieutenant Colonel Oliver Martson the camp was built is 1940, as a World War II training center. At its peak it housed 45,000 troops in 1945. The camp opened as the  Camp Nacimiento Replacement Training Center, but the name was changed, to honor Corporal Harold W. Roberts, a tank driver in World War I who was posthumously awarded the Medal of Honor. For World War II 436,000 Infantry and Field Artillery troops were trained at the camp. Camp Roberts was one of the largest training camps during World War II. At the camp a 750 bed Army hospital was built to serve the troops. The camp also held prisoners of war. German and Italian prisoners of war were held at the camp during WW2. Italian prisoners of war were given the option to volunteer to work in special Italian Service Unit and work at Camp Roberts' 10th Italian Quartermaster Service Company.  After the war the camp was inactive, but for the few National Guard and Army Reserve troops that used it for summer training. In 1950 for the Korean War the camp became active again.  After the Korean War the camp was inactive again. The US Army's Combat Development Experimental Command began to operate the camp for weapons testing. The US Navy used the vast camp training gunners with live fire. In April 1970 the US Army closed the army camp. The camp was turned over to the California National Guard in 1971 for a training center.

Camp Roberts Historical Museum is on the base.

 From 1955 to 1990 at  the US Army operated Camp Roberts Main Army Airfield. This was a single northwest/southeast  paved runway and a control tower. The runway was on the southeast side of the Camp Roberts parade ground. The runway today is vacant, has one building left on it and is partly used for a parking lot.

 From 1951 to 1955 at  the US Army operated Camp Roberts Army Airfield. This was a single northwest/southeast  dirt runway. The runway was on the southeast side of the base, running parallel to the Salinas river. There is no trace of this original base runway today, just brush alongside the river.

See also
Camp Laguna Arizona proving ground in WW2
Yuma Test Branch Arizona proving ground in WW2
Yuma Proving Ground current Arizona proving ground
California during World War II

References

Further reading

External links

Camp Roberts official website
Camp Roberts Historical Museum website
Camp Roberts Hunting Info (JHO)
Camp Roberts Fishing Info (JHO)
Historic California Posts, Camps, Stations and Airfields; Camp Roberts
Local Shopping and Local Events Near Camp Roberts

Forts in California
Installations of the United States Army in California
Buildings and structures in Monterey County, California
Buildings and structures in San Luis Obispo County, California
Salinas River (California)
Military and war museums in California
Museums in San Luis Obispo County, California
 

Military history of California
Military installations established in 1940
1940 establishments in California